Richard Paul Gervais (born November 4, 1959) is a former professional American football safety in the National Football League. He attended Stanford University. He played with the San Francisco 49ers from 1981 to 1983. He then started a business called KG Investment.

External links
Pro-Football reference

1959 births
Living people
Sportspeople from Bend, Oregon
Players of American football from Oregon
American football safeties
Stanford Cardinal football players
San Francisco 49ers players